A general election was held in the U.S. state of Wyoming on Tuesday, November 4, 1930. All of the state's executive officers—the Governor, Secretary of State, Auditor, Treasurer, and Superintendent of Public Instruction—were up for election. Republicans narrowly held onto the Governor's office and won every other state office.

Governor

Incumbent Republican Governor Frank Emerson ran for re-election to a second term. After beating back a challenge in the Republican primary from State Treasurer William H. Edelman, he faced State Senator Leslie A. Miller in the general election. As was the case in 1926, Emerson faced a close race, and only narrowly defeated Miller to win re-election. However, Emerson would die shortly after being sworn into his second term, triggering a special election in 1932.

Secretary of State
Incumbent Republican Secretary of State Alonzo M. Clark ran for re-election to a second term. After defeating two challengers in the Republican primary—State Representative A. D. Persson and former State Senator H. S. Kirk—he advanced to the general election, where he was opposed by O. O. Davis, the editor of the Green River Star. Clark overwhelmingly defeated Davis to win re-election. Just weeks into Clark's second term, however, Governor Emerson would die, elevating Clark as acting governor—though he continued to serve as Secretary of State.

Democratic primary

Candidates
 O. O. Davis, editor of the Green River Star

Results

Republican primary

Candidates
 Alonzo M. Clark, incumbent Secretary of State
 A. D. Persson, State Representative
 H. S. Kirk, former State Senator

Results

General election

Results

Auditor
State Auditor Vincent Carter was elected to Congress in 1928, and Governor Frank Emerson appointed Roscoe Alcorn, the President the Wyoming Press Association and a former State Representative, as Carter's replacement. Alcorn ran for re-election in 1930, and was opposed by accountant C. H. Reimerth in the Republican primary. Alcorn defeated Reimerth in a landslide and advanced to the general election. No Democratic candidate filed to oppose Alcorn, but A. E. Wilde received enough write-in votes to win the party's nomination. Wilde, however, declined the nomination. Accordingly, the Wyoming Democratic Party named June J. Creswell, the former Converse County Treasurer, as its nominee. Alcorn was re-elected over Creswell in a landslide.

Democratic primary
No Democratic candidates filed for State Auditor. However, because A. E. Wilde received the most write-in votes for the race, he was entitled to the nomination under state law, which he declined. The Democratic Party then named June J. Creswell, the former Converse County Treasurer, as Wilde's replacement on the ballot.

Republican primary

Candidates
 Roscoe Alcorn, incumbent State Auditor
 C. H. Reimerth, accountant

Results

General election

Results

Treasurer
Incumbent State Treasurer William H. Edelman opted to challenge Governor Frank Emerson for re-election rather than seeking a second term, creating an open seat. Harry R. Weston, a banker, won the Republican primary over former Cheyenne Mayor Robert N. LaFontaine, and then faced former State Representative Bert Waddell in the general election. Weston defeated Waddell by a wide margin to win his first (and only) term as Treasurer.

Democratic primary

Candidates
 Bert Waddell, former State Representative

Results

Republican primary

Candidates
 Harry R. Weston, banker
 Robert N. LaFontaine, former Mayor of Cheyenne

Results

General election

Results

Superintendent of Public Instruction
Incumbent Republican Superintendent of Public Instruction Katharine A. Morton ran for re-election to a fourth term. She faced Nelle O'Donnell in the Republican primary, which, despite Morton's longtime popularity, was the closest primary in the state. No Democratic candidates originally filed to oppose Morton, but L. C. Tidball, the former state commissioner of education, received enough write-in votes to win the nomination. Tidball declined the spot, however, citing his belief that politics shouldn't be mixed with schools. Accordingly, the state party named Margaret S. "Anna" Preston, the widow of former state Attorney General Douglas Preston, as its nominee. Despite Morton's long history of electoral landslides and the Democratic Party's poor organization in the race, the campaign between Morton and Preston was quite close. Morton ultimately only won re-election by just 1,382 votes, winning her fourth and final term in office.

Democratic primary

Candidates
No Democratic candidates filed for State Superintendent of Public Instruction. However, because L. C. Tidball received the most write-in votes for the race, he was entitled to the nomination under state law, which he declined. The Democratic Party then named Anna Preston as Tidball's replacement on the ballot.

Republican primary

Candidates
 Katharine A. Morton, incumbent Superintendent of Instruction
 Nelle O'Donnell

Results

General election

Results

References

 
Wyoming